Estadio Ramón "Tahuichi" Aguilera Costas is a multi-purpose stadium in Santa Cruz, Bolivia. It is used mostly for football matches, on club level by Blooming, Oriente Petrolero, Destroyers, and Royal Pari. The stadium has a capacity of 38,000 people and was opened in 1940. It was also one of the official stadiums for the 1997 Copa America as well as a number of international continental tournaments, such as the Copa Libertadores and Copa Sudamericana.

Organized by the Tahuichi Academy, every year during January this stadium hosts one of the greatest youth football tournaments in the world, the "Mundialito Paz y Unidad."  Past participants of the U-15 tournament have included Real Madrid, Benfica, Atlas FC, Vasco da Gama, River Plate, Colo-Colo and many youth national teams.

History

Name Changes 
At first it was named Estadio Departamental de Santa Cruz, then in 1972 following the death of auto racing legend Willy Bendeck in a local competition, the decision to name the departamental stadium after Willy Bendeck was finalized.

In 1979 the Tahuichi Aguilera football academy was invited to an international U-15 soccer tournament to be held in Argentina. The team came to be crowned tournament champion, which created a decision to rename the stadium in recognition of the founder of the Tahuichi Academy (Ramón "Tahuichi" Aguilera Costas), to be called Estadio Tahuichi Aguilera whose name it has today.

Renovations 
The stadium is currently under an extensive renovation that began in 2014. The renovations will cost 48 million Bolivians. The first phase of the project includes new bathrooms, a subterranean parking lot, new changing rooms, security cameras, renovated suites, and renovated press cabins. Phase One was completed in 2016.

Phase Two consists of new lighting, addition of seating, referee locker rooms and doping rooms.

The third phase was completed in late 2019.

The stadium is currently in the 4th phase. When the renovations are over, the capacity will be increased to 40,000.

Notable Concerts
 Shakira: March 11, 1997 - Pies Descalzos Tour
Floricienta: October 8, 2005
RBD: April 19, 2008 - Empezar Desde Cero World Tour
Los Fabulosos Cadillacs: April 30, 2009 - Satánico Pop Tour
David Guetta - November 16, 2010
Luis Miguel: December 8, 2010 - Luis Miguel Tour
 Shakira: March 21, 2011 - The Sun Comes Out World Tour
 Enrique Iglesias: July 5, 2011 -  Euphoria Tour
Scorpions - September 12, 2012 - Final Sting World Tour
Silvio Rodríguez: April 15, 2013
Alejandra Guzmán: May 31, 2014 - La Guzmán Primera Fila Tour
 Romeo Santos: April 16, 2015 - Vol. 2 Tour
Ricky Martin: November 5, 2016 - One World Tour
Maná: February 24, 2017 - Cama Incendiada Tour
J Balvin: August 5, 2017 - Energía Tour
Juanes: August 6, 2017 - Bolivia 360 Music Festival

Notable matches

1997 Copa América

References

Sports venues completed in 1939
Ramon Tahuichi Aguilera
Club Blooming
Club Destroyers
Oriente Petrolero
Copa América stadiums
Multi-purpose stadiums in Bolivia
Buildings and structures in Santa Cruz de la Sierra
Buildings and structures in Santa Cruz Department (Bolivia)